Schindleria praematura, Schindler's fish is a species of neotenic goby which was formerly placed in the monogeneric family Schindleriidae but which is currently classified within the Gobiidae. It is associated with reefs and has an Indo-Pacific distribution from South Africa and Madagascar to Hawaii and the sea mounts of the South Pacific. The generic name and the common name honour the German zoologist Otto Schindler (1906–1959) who described the species.

In popular culture

The song "The Fish (Schindleria Praematurus)" by the British rock group Yes, from their 1971 album Fragile, refers to this species albeit with an incorrect spelling of the species name. The genus name is sung as "shine-duh-leer-ee-ah" by bassist Chris Squire & vocalist Jon Anderson, in order to fit the song's melody. "The Fish" was Squire's nickname, as he was known to luxuriate in his hotel room's baths for long periods while on tour, and the song is a mostly-instrumental feature for his bass playing.

References

Schindleriidae
Gobiidae
Fish described in 1930